Arzamasova is a surname. Notable people with the surname include:

 Liza Arzamasova (born 1995), Russian actress and television personality
 Maryna Arzamasova (born 1987), Belarusian middle-distance runner